East York Historic District is a national historic district located at Springettsbury Township in York County, Pennsylvania. The district includes 262 contributing buildings in the residential community of East York. The community was laid out in 1903, but the houses primarily built in the 1930s and 1940s.  The community includes notable examples of Colonial Revival, Tudor Revival, and Prairie School style dwellings.  The district also includes the former school (1912), a three-story Art Deco-style apartment building (1936), and Advent Church.

It was listed on the National Register of Historic Places in 1999.

References 

Colonial Revival architecture in Pennsylvania
Historic districts in York County, Pennsylvania
Historic districts on the National Register of Historic Places in Pennsylvania
Prairie School architecture in Pennsylvania
Springettsbury Township, York County, Pennsylvania
Tudor Revival architecture in Pennsylvania
National Register of Historic Places in York County, Pennsylvania